Kunjikoonan is a 2002 Indian Malayalam-language romantic comedy film directed by Sasi Shanker and produced by Milan Jaleel. The film's script was written by Benny P. Nayarambalam, based on his own stage play Vikalanga Varsham. Starring Dileep, Navya Nair and Manya with Saikumar, Cochin Haneefa, Salim Kumar, Spadikam George, Nedumudi Venu and Bindu Panicker. Dileep played dual roles in this movie. Dileep won Asianet Film Awards for Best Actor. The film was later remade into different indian Languages such as Odia as Rasika Naagara (2003), Tamil as Perazhagan (2004), in Kannada as Manmatha (2006).

Synopsis 
The story revolves around Kunjan alias Vimal Kumar, a village youth who is sympathized for his hunchback looks but is lauded for selfless service to others. He covers up his handicap with humor. Unmindful of his looks, Kunjan goes around seeking a suitable bride, with the help of his friend Thoma. Brushing aside many an insult hurled at him, he carries on. He carried the hardships of his life on his back, the pain of others too. He was of peak human moral, a man of great virtue

In contrast to him is Prasad, a violent college student, who loves his classmate Lakshmi. She comes across Kunjan, who assures her that he would get her married to the man of her heart, but she is killed in a fracas involving a gangster named Vasu. Meanwhile, the hunchback Kunjan comes across an orphaned poor blind girl, Chembagam. He wins her heart  by helping her out.

Thanks to his efforts, Chembagam regains her vision (the eyes of deceased Lakshmi are transplanted to her). This results in a tussle between Kunjan and Prasad, as to whom Chembagam belongs to now. However, fearing his looks, the hunchback, Kunjan, decides to leave way for the other. But fate has different things for him, where Vasu returns to avenge Kunjan. Prasad remembers Lakshmi and avenges her death by killing Vasu. Prasad approves Kunjan and Chembagam's wedding before being sent to jail.

Cast

Dileep in dual role as Vimal Kumar (Kunjan) & Prasad
Navya Nair as Chembakam, Kunjan's love interest
Manya as Lakshmi, Prasad's love interest
Sai Kumar as 'Garudan' Vasu
Cochin Haneefa as Thomas
Salim Kumar as Chandran
Machan Varghese as Divakaran
Bindu Panicker as Aishumma 
Guinness Pakru as Suhasini
Nedumudi Venu as Constable Padmanabhan, Prasad's father
Manka Mahesh as Prasad's mother
Spadikam George as Lakshmi's father
Reena as Lakshmi's mother
Ponnamma Babu
Narayanankutty
Deepika Mohan
Nithya Das in a cameo role as Kunjan's dream wife in the song "Kunjante Penninu"

Production

Filming 
The film was mainly shot at various locations in Thodupuzha. It was filmed in 83 days.

Soundtrack 

The songs of this movie was composed by Mohan Sithara and penned by Yusufali Kechery. In 2002 Radhika Thilak received best female playback singer award from Kerala film critics association for the song Omanamalare ninmaran.

References

External links
 

2000s Malayalam-language films
2002 romantic comedy-drama films
Indian romantic comedy-drama films
2002 films
Malayalam films remade in other languages
Films about disability in India
Films directed by Sasi Shanker
Films scored by Mohan Sithara
2002 comedy films
2002 drama films
Indian films based on plays